The 2022 Duke Blue Devils men's soccer team represented Duke University during the 2022 NCAA Division I men's soccer season.  The Blue Devils were led by head coach John Kerr, in his fifteenth season.  They played their home games at Koskinen Stadium.  The team was founded in 1935 and currently plays in the Atlantic Coast Conference.

The Blue Devils finished the season 13–2–4 overall and 5–0–3 in ACC play to finish in first place in the Coastal Division.  As the first overall seed in the ACC Tournament, the received a bye into the Quarterfinals where they were upset at home by eighth seed Clemson.  They received an at-large bid to the NCAA Tournament and were awarded the seventh overall seed.  Being a seeded team, they received a bye into the Second Round where they defeated  and then  in the Third Round before being upset by unseeded  in the Quarterfinals.

Background

The Blue Devils finished the season 14–5–1 overall and 5–2–1 in ACC play to finish in a tie for first place in the Coastal Division.  As the third overall seed in the ACC Tournament, the received a bye into the Quarterfinals where they defeated Wake Forest and then defeated Clemson in the Semifinals.  They fell in the final to Notre Dame.  They received an at-large bid to the NCAA Tournament and were awarded the seventh seed.  Being a seeded team, they received a bye into the Second Round where they defeated UCLA before losing to tenth seeded Saint Louis in the Third Round.

Player movement

Players leaving

Players arriving

Incoming Transfers

Recruiting Class

Squad

Roster

Team management

Source:

Schedule 
Source:

|-
!colspan=6 style=""| Exhibition

|-
!colspan=6 style=""| Regular season

|-
!colspan=6 style=""| ACC Tournament

|-
!colspan=6 style=""| NCAA Tournament

Awards and honors

2023 MLS Super Draft

Source:

Rankings

References

2022
Duke Blue Devils
Duke Blue Devils
Duke Blue Devils men's soccer
Duke